Agrotera fumosa is a moth in the family Crambidae. It was described by George Hampson in 1899. It is found in the Democratic Republic of the Congo (Equateur, Katanga, East Kasai), Ghana and Ivory Coast.

References

Moths described in 1899
Spilomelinae
Moths of Africa